Pristimantis cerasinus, also known as Limon robber frog, is a species of frog in the family Strabomantidae. It is found in Costa Rica, Honduras, Nicaragua, and Panama from sea level to  asl.
Its natural habitats are humid lowland and montane forests. It can sometimes occur on small coffee farms. It is threatened by habitat loss.

References

cerasinus
Amphibians of Costa Rica
Amphibians of Honduras
Amphibians of Nicaragua
Amphibians of Panama
Amphibians described in 1875
Taxonomy articles created by Polbot